Orešac may refer to:
 Orešac (Vršac), a village in the municipality of Vršac, Serbia
 Orešac (Knjaževac), a village in the municipality of Knjaževac, Serbia
 Orešac (Suhopolje), a village in the municipality of Suhopolje, Croatia